Elshan Rzazade (born on 11 September 1993), is an Azerbaijani football player. He plays for Shuvalan FK.

Career

Club
On 30 January 2016, Rzazade signed with Neftchi Baku.

International
On 17 November 2015, Rzazade made his senior international debut for Azerbaijan game against Moldova.

Career statistics

International

Statistics accurate as of match played 17 November 2015

References

External links
 

1993 births
Living people
Azerbaijani footballers
Azerbaijan international footballers
Khazar Lankaran FK players
Azerbaijan Premier League players
Association football midfielders
Neftçi PFK players